Deh-e Sefid Kan Sorkh (also Romanized as Deh-e Sefīd Kān Sorkh; also known as Deh-e Sefīd and Deh Safīd) is a village in Pachehlak-e Sharqi Rural District, in the Central District of Aligudarz County, Lorestan Province, Iran. At the 2006 census, its population was 391, in 76 families.

References 

Towns and villages in Aligudarz County